The Lakeshore Chinooks are a baseball team based in Mequon, Wisconsin, United States and a member of the Northwoods League, a collegiate summer baseball league. The Chinooks play their home games at Kapco Park on the campus of Concordia University Wisconsin.

Summer collegiate leagues provide an opportunity for college players to spend their summers and display their talents to professional scouts. Players must be enrolled in college and have at least one year of athletic eligibility to participate. College players gain experience with the opportunity to play under the minor league conditions using wooden bats, minor league specification baseballs, overnight road trips, and playing nightly before fans.

College interns gain experience by handling a number of duties at Chinooks games including ticketing, operations, on-field promotions, and webcast production. Games are webcast via the Northwoods League website.

Chinooks players stay with local host families during the season. More than two dozen local families provide housing.

Ticket prices are $14 reserved box, $11 reserved grandstand, and $8 general admission.

History

League entry
The Lakeshore Chinooks became the seventh Northwoods League team in Wisconsin.  Based at Concordia University Wisconsin in Mequon, a northern suburb of Milwaukee, the Chinooks were the first Northwoods League franchise to make its home in a major metropolitan area.

Kapco Park
Kapco Inc., a metal fabrication and stamping company in Grafton, donated $1 million toward completion of the school's new baseball field, named Kapco Park. The donation was part of a $2.7 million fund already allocated for the stadium. Concordia's baseball team uses Kapco Park in the spring.

The Chinooks were the first Northwoods League franchise to make its home on a university campus. Kapco Park acknowledges the Milwaukee Brewers with its outfield dimensions, the last two numbers reflected in famous uniforms - 317 feet in left for Jim Gantner, 344 to left-center for Hank Aaron, 404 to center for Paul Molitor and 319 to right for Robin Yount, who helped design the fence.

In 2012, the Wisconsin Interscholastic Athletic Association (WIAA) moved the State High School summer baseball tournament to Kapco Park until the tournament ended in 2018.

Kapco Park hosted the 2014 Northwoods League All-Star Game on July 22, 2014.

2012 season
The inaugural season began May 30, 2012, vs. the Green Bay Bullfrogs (2-1 Chinooks).  The home opener was Monday, June 11, 2012.  The team finished with a 35–35 record, 4th place in the South division.   2012 attendance was 46,022.

Launch marketing featured Robin Yount in a series of television spots and included a guest appearance by Milwaukee Brewers GM Doug Melvin.

2012 manager was John Vodenlich, the coach at UW-Whitewater.

2013 season

Eddy Morgan, Head Coach at UW-Superior, managed the Chinooks for the 2013 season.  Morgan joined the Chinooks for the inaugural 2012 season as an assistant coach.  Prior to UW-Superior, Morgan spent nine seasons as an assistant coach and recruiting coordinator at the College of St. Scholastica.  Joining Morgan as an assistant coach was Scott Hood, currently an assistant coach at Kansas.  Hood played at South Dakota State University where he also coached for two seasons.

The 16-team Northwoods League celebrated its 20th anniversary season in 2013 with the season opener on Wednesday, May 29.  Chinooks home opener was Thursday, May 30 vs. Wisconsin Rapids Rafters.  Major League Baseball commissioner, Bud Selig, threw the first pitch to Major League Baseball Hall of Fame member and current minority Chinooks owner, Robin Yount.

The 2013 season featured inter-divisional play for the first time since 2009.

The Chinooks finished the 2013 season at 44–26, capturing first place overall in the South division.

The Lakeshore Chinooks were ranked 21st on the Perfect Game Top 50 Summer Collegiate Teams for 2013.

2014 season

Northwoods League Championship
Eddy Morgan returned to the Chinooks for his second season as Field Manager. Morgan was named the new head coach of the Concordia University-Wisconsin Falcons baseball team in June 2013.

Mark Moriarty returned to the Chinooks coaching staff in 2014.  Prior to joining the Chinooks and CUW, the St. Scholastica grad had coaching stints at Concordia St. Paul (2012) and Augustana (2008-2011).

MLB Hall-of-Fame member and Lakeshore Chinooks minority owner Robin Yount's Chinooks Jersey #19 was retired by the team on May 31, 2014.

On July, 21st, Bud Selig, then-Commissioner of Major League Baseball, was the featured speaker at the Northwoods League All-Star Banquet held in nearby Glendale, Wisconsin.

The Northwoods League All-Star Game was held at Kapco Park on July 22, 2014.

The Chinooks clinched the first-half South Division championship on the last day of the regular season when Blake Butler hit a walk-off home run to topple the Kenosha Kingfish, 5–4, at Kapco Park. In the second half, the Chinooks became just the third team in league history to accumulate 50 victories, winning the organization's third-straight South Division half title.  The team continued its dominance through the playoffs, sweeping the overall South Division second-place Wisconsin Woodchucks two games to none in the Division Playoff to advance to the franchise's first Summer Collegiate World Series.  Against the North Division champion Mankato MoonDogs, the Chinooks won the first game of the series in Mankato, 5–4, before returning to Mequon and completing their undefeated run through the playoffs with a 3–0 victory in Game Two to clinch the franchise's first-ever league championship.

2015 season 
In what is called 'The Chinooks Fireworks Display', the Chinooks beat Kalamazoo 16-2 behind Lucas Raley's four home runs.

Lucas Raley sets single season Home Run and Hits record.

Final season record 36-36.

2016 season 
Final season record 35–37.

Mid-Season All Stars.  Keenan Bartlett, Tim Dalporto, Marshall Kasowski

NWL Pitcher of the Year:  Marshall Kasowski

Post Season All Star:  Marshall Kasowski

Rawlings Finest in the Field, Joe Duncan

PG Summer All American, Marshall Kasowski

2017 season 
Final season record 38–34.

Mid Season All-Stars:  Nick Gatewood, Matthew MIka, Jacob Richardson, Parker Sanburn

Post Season All-Stars:  Matthew Mika, Jacob Richardson

Season by season team records

2012: 35-35

2013: 44-26

2014: 50-21

2015: 36-36

2016: 35-37

2017: 38-34

2018: 29-42

2019: 32-40

2020: No games (COVID-19)

2021: 31-39

2022: 36-36

Ownership
The Chinooks' ownership group consists of twelve investors; most notably Jim Kacmarcik, president of Kapco,Inc, Milwaukee Brewers play-by-play announcer Bob Uecker, and Brewers legend and Baseball Hall of Famer Robin Yount.

Player achievements

2012
Kapco Team Awards:

Kapco Steel Slugger:  The original Kapco Steel Slugger Award was awarded to Eric Aguilera (Illinois State). Aguilera finished the season with a .369 batting average, 69 hits, 31 runs, 4 home runs, and 28 RBI's. Following an appearance in the 2012 All-Star Game, Aguilera's season was cut short due to injury.

Robin Yount:  Charlie Markson, Notre Dame, was selected for the Robin Yount Award which goes to the player who exemplified high personal standards both on and off of the field.

Chinooks Pitcher of the Year: Joe Greenfield, Eastern Illinois. Greenfield was drafted by the Boston Red Sox in the 22nd round of the 2012 draft but opted to continue his collegiate playing career. He appeared in 13 games, 7 of those in a starting role, finished the season with a 2.29 ERA and a 5–1 record including one complete game.

Most Valuable Player:  Forrest Chadwick, Southern Maine University. Chadwick ended the season with a .301 batting average, 69 hits, 42 runs, 11 home runs, and 52 RBI's.  Forrest was one of three Northwoods League players to have a perfect fielding percentage while committing no errors.

The four award recipients were presented with their 2012 awards on Opening Day May 30 during an on-field presentation prior to the game.

2013 
Most Valuable Player: Mike Hollenbeck, Illinois State

2014 
Most Valuable Player: Brett Siddall, Canisius College.

2015 
Most Valuable Player:  Lucas Raley, Lake Erie College.

Kapco Steel Slugger Award: Anthony Massicci, Canisius College

2016 
Kapco Team Awards:

Kapco Steel Slugger:   Matt Reardon, Florida Gulf Coast University

Robin Yount:    Joe Duncan, Eastern Illinois University

Robin Yount:     Owen Miller, Illinois State University

Pitcher of the Year:  Marshall Kasowski, University of Houston

Most Valuable Player:  Marshal Kasowski, University of Houston

2017 Team Awards

Chinooks to play in MLB
 Zack Granite
 Andrew Stevenson
 Harrison Bader
 Brian Anderson
 Eric Hanhold
 Jake Noll
 Shaun Anderson
 Alex Young
 Luke Raley
 Zac Lowther
 Owen Miller
 Greg Deichmann
 Mark Kolozsvary
 Cam Vieaux

References

External links
Lakeshore Chinooks official site
Northwoods League official site

Northwoods League teams
Amateur baseball teams in Wisconsin
Baseball in Milwaukee
Ozaukee County, Wisconsin